The 2023 St. Louis BattleHawks season is the second season for the St. Louis BattleHawks as a professional American football franchise. They are charter members of the XFL, one of eight teams to compete in the league for the 2023 season. The BattleHawks will play their home games at The Dome at America's Center and be led by head coach Anthony Becht.

Three weeks into the season, Linebackers Coach Dave Steckel resigned and Chris Claiborne replaced him.

Schedule
All times Central

Game summaries

Week 1: at San Antonio Brahmas

Week 2: at Seattle Sea Dragons

Week 3: at DC Defenders

Week 4: vs. Arlington Renegades
{{Americanfootballbox
|titlestyle=;text-align:center;
|state=autocollapse
|title=Week 4: Arlington Renegades at St. Louis BattleHawks – Game summary
|date=
|time=3:00 p.m. CDT
|road=Renegades
|R1=0|R2=3|R3=0|R4=8
|home=BattleHawks
|H1=3|H2=8|H3=6|H4=7
|stadium=The Dome at America's Center, St. Louis, Missouri
|attendance=38,310
|weather=
|referee=Mike Vandervelde
|TV=ESPN2
|TVAnnouncers=Tom Hart, Greg McElroy, and Cole Cubelic
|reference=
|scoring=

First quarter
 STL – Donny Hageman 28-yard field goal, 5:46. BattleHawks 3–0. Drive: 10 Plays, 45 Yards, 5:46.

Second quarter
 ARL – Taylor Russolino 37-yard field goal, 4:35. Tied 3–3. Drive: 4 Plays, 4 Yards, 1:42.
 STL – Darrius Shepherd 27-yard pass from A. J. McCarron (2-pt Conversion Good by Brian Hill), 0:11. BattleHawks 11–3. Drive: 8 Plays, 67 Yards, 4:16.

Third quarter 
 STL – Brian Hill 15-yard rush (2-pt Conversion No Good), 6:48. BattleHawks 17–3. Drive: 6 Plays, 68 Yards, 3:12.

Fourth quarter 
 ARL – De'Veon Smith 1-yard rush (2-pt Conversion Good by De'Veon Smith), 12:40. BattleHawks 17–11. Drive: 9 Plays, 87 Yards, 4:44. 
 STL – Hakeem Butler 25-yard pass from A. J. McCarron (1-pt Conversion Good by Jake Sutherland), 9:55. BattleHawks 24–11. Drive: 6 Plays, 67 Yards, 2:45.|stats=

Top passers
 ARL – Kyle Sloter – 23/39, 205 yards, 0 TD
 STL – A. J. McCarron – 20/27, 214 yards, 2 TD

Top rushers
 ARL – De'Veon Smith – 9 rushes, 24 yards
 STL – Brian Hill – 18 rushes, 89 yards

Top receivers 
 ARL – Sal Cannella – 6 receptions, 40 yards
 STL – Darrius Shepherd – 8 receptions, 91 yards

}}

Week 5: vs. DC Defenders

Week 6: at Vegas Vipers

Standings

 Staff *Linebcakers coach Dave Steckel left the team after Week 2. Chris Claiborne took over Week 3.''

Roster

References

St. Louis
St. Louis BattleHawks
St. Louis BattleHawks